In quantum mechanics, identical particles (also called indistinguishable or indiscernible particles) are particles that cannot be distinguished from one another, even in principle. Species of identical particles include, but are not limited to, elementary particles (such as electrons), composite subatomic particles (such as atomic nuclei), as well as atoms and molecules. Quasiparticles also behave in this way. Although all known indistinguishable particles only exist at the quantum scale, there is no exhaustive list of all possible sorts of particles nor a clear-cut limit of applicability, as explored in quantum statistics.

There are two main categories of identical particles: bosons, which can share quantum states, and fermions, which cannot (as described by the Pauli exclusion principle). Examples of bosons are photons, gluons, phonons, helium-4 nuclei and all mesons. Examples of fermions are electrons, neutrinos, quarks, protons, neutrons, and helium-3 nuclei.

The fact that particles can be identical has important consequences in statistical mechanics, where calculations rely on probabilistic arguments, which are sensitive to whether or not the objects being studied are identical. As a result, identical particles exhibit markedly different statistical behaviour from distinguishable particles. For example, the indistinguishability of particles has been proposed as a solution to Gibbs' mixing paradox.

Distinguishing between particles 

There are two methods for distinguishing between particles. The first method relies on differences in the intrinsic physical properties of the particles, such as mass, electric charge, and spin. If differences exist, it is possible to distinguish between the particles by measuring the relevant properties. However, it is an empirical fact that microscopic particles of the same species have completely equivalent physical properties. For instance, every electron in the universe has exactly the same electric charge; this is why it is possible to speak of such a thing as "the charge of the electron".

Even if the particles have equivalent physical properties, there remains a second method for distinguishing between particles, which is to track the trajectory of each particle. As long as the position of each particle can be measured with infinite precision (even when the particles collide), then there would be no ambiguity about which particle is which.

The problem with the second approach is that it contradicts the principles of quantum mechanics. According to quantum theory, the particles do not possess definite positions during the periods between measurements. Instead, they are governed by wavefunctions that give the probability of finding a particle at each position. As time passes, the wavefunctions tend to spread out and overlap. Once this happens, it becomes impossible to determine, in a subsequent measurement, which of the particle positions correspond to those measured earlier. The particles are then said to be indistinguishable.

Quantum mechanical description

Symmetrical and antisymmetrical states 

What follows is an example to make the above discussion concrete, using the formalism developed in the article on the mathematical formulation of quantum mechanics.

Let n denote a complete set of (discrete) quantum numbers for specifying single-particle states (for example, for the particle in a box problem, take n to be the quantized wave vector of the wavefunction.) For simplicity, consider a system composed of two particles that are not interacting with each other. Suppose that one particle is in the state n1, and the other is in the state n2. The quantum state of the system is denoted by the expression

where the order of the tensor product matters ( if , then the particle 1 occupies the state n2 while the particle 2 occupies the state n1). This is the canonical way of constructing a basis for a tensor product space  of the combined system from the individual spaces.

 "the particle 1 occupies the n1 state and the particle 2 occupies the n2 state" ≠ "the particle 1 occupies the n2 state and the particle 2 occupies the n1 state".

Two states are physically equivalent only if they differ at most by a complex phase factor. For two indistinguishable particles, a state before the particle exchange must be physically equivalent to the state after the exchange, so these two states differ at most by a complex phase factor. This fact suggests that a state for two indistinguishable (and non-interacting) particles is given by following two possibilities: 

States where it is a sum are known as symmetric, while states involving the difference are called antisymmetric. More completely, symmetric states have the form

while antisymmetric states have the form

Note that if n1 and n2 are the same, the antisymmetric expression gives zero, which cannot be a state vector since it cannot be normalized. In other words, more than one identical particle cannot occupy an antisymmetric state (one antisymmetric state can be occupied only by one particle). This is known as the Pauli exclusion principle, and it is the fundamental reason behind the chemical properties of atoms and the stability of matter.

Exchange symmetry 

The importance of symmetric and antisymmetric states is ultimately based on empirical evidence. It appears to be a fact of nature that identical particles do not occupy states of a mixed symmetry, such as

There is actually an exception to this rule, which will be discussed later. On the other hand, it can be shown that the symmetric and antisymmetric states are in a sense special, by examining a particular symmetry of the multiple-particle states known as exchange symmetry.

Define a linear operator P, called the exchange operator. When it acts on a tensor product of two state vectors, it exchanges the values of the state vectors:

P is both Hermitian and unitary. Because it is unitary, it can be regarded as a symmetry operator. This symmetry may be described as the symmetry under the exchange of labels attached to the particles (i.e., to the single-particle Hilbert spaces).

Clearly,  (the identity operator), so the eigenvalues of P are +1 and −1. The corresponding eigenvectors are the symmetric and antisymmetric states:

In other words, symmetric and antisymmetric states are essentially unchanged under the exchange of particle labels: they are only multiplied by a factor of +1 or −1, rather than being "rotated" somewhere else in the Hilbert space. This indicates that the particle labels have no physical meaning, in agreement with the earlier discussion on indistinguishability.

It will be recalled that P is Hermitian. As a result, it can be regarded as an observable of the system, which means that, in principle, a measurement can be performed to find out if a state is symmetric or antisymmetric. Furthermore, the equivalence of the particles indicates that the Hamiltonian can be written in a symmetrical form, such as

It is possible to show that such Hamiltonians satisfy the commutation relation

According to the Heisenberg equation, this means that the value of P is a constant of motion. If the quantum state is initially symmetric (antisymmetric), it will remain symmetric (antisymmetric) as the system evolves. Mathematically, this says that the state vector is confined to one of the two eigenspaces of P, and is not allowed to range over the entire Hilbert space. Thus, that eigenspace might as well be treated as the actual Hilbert space of the system. This is the idea behind the definition of Fock space.

Fermions and bosons 

The choice of symmetry or antisymmetry is determined by the species of particle. For example, symmetric states must always be used when describing photons or helium-4 atoms, and antisymmetric states when describing electrons or protons.

Particles which exhibit symmetric states are called bosons. The nature of symmetric states has important consequences for the statistical properties of systems composed of many identical bosons. These statistical properties are described as Bose–Einstein statistics.

Particles which exhibit antisymmetric states are called fermions. Antisymmetry gives rise to the Pauli exclusion principle, which forbids identical fermions from sharing the same quantum state. Systems of many identical fermions are described by Fermi–Dirac statistics.

Parastatistics are also possible.

In certain two-dimensional systems, mixed symmetry can occur. These exotic particles are known as anyons, and they obey fractional statistics. Experimental evidence for the existence of anyons exists in the fractional quantum Hall effect, a phenomenon observed in the two-dimensional electron gases that form the inversion layer of MOSFETs. There is another type of statistic, known as braid statistics, which are associated with particles known as plektons.

The spin-statistics theorem relates the exchange symmetry of identical particles to their spin. It states that bosons have integer spin, and fermions have half-integer spin. Anyons possess fractional spin.

N particles 

The above discussion generalizes readily to the case of N particles. Suppose there are N particles with quantum numbers n1, n2, ..., nN. If the particles are bosons, they occupy a totally symmetric state, which is symmetric under the exchange of any two particle labels:

Here, the sum is taken over all different states under permutations p acting on N elements. The square root left to the sum is a normalizing constant. The quantity mn stands for the number of times each of the single-particle states n appears in the N-particle state. Note that Σn mn = N.

In the same vein, fermions occupy totally antisymmetric states:

Here,  is the sign of each permutation (i.e.  if  is composed of an even number of transpositions, and  if odd). Note that there is no  term, because each single-particle state can appear only once in a fermionic state. Otherwise the sum would again be zero due to the antisymmetry, thus representing a physically impossible state. This is the Pauli exclusion principle for many particles.

These states have been normalized so that

Measurement 

Suppose there is a system of N bosons (fermions) in the symmetric (antisymmetric) state

and a measurement is performed on some other set of discrete observables, m. In general, this yields some result m1 for one particle, m2 for another particle, and so forth. If the particles are bosons (fermions), the state after the measurement must remain symmetric (antisymmetric), i.e.

The probability of obtaining a particular result for the m measurement is

It can be shown that 

which verifies that the total probability is 1.  The sum has to be restricted to ordered values of m1, ..., mN to ensure that each multi-particle state is not counted more than once.

Wavefunction representation 

So far, the discussion has included only discrete observables. It can be extended to continuous observables, such as the position x.

Recall that an eigenstate of a continuous observable represents an infinitesimal range of values of the observable, not a single value as with discrete observables. For instance, if a particle is in a state |ψ⟩, the probability of finding it in a region of volume d3x surrounding some position x is

As a result, the continuous eigenstates |x⟩ are normalized to the delta function instead of unity:

Symmetric and antisymmetric multi-particle states can be constructed from continuous eigenstates in the same way as before. However, it is customary to use a different normalizing constant:

A many-body wavefunction can be written,

 

where the single-particle wavefunctions are defined, as usual, by

The most important property of these wavefunctions is that exchanging any two of the coordinate variables changes the wavefunction by only a plus or minus sign. This is the manifestation of symmetry and antisymmetry in the wavefunction representation:

The many-body wavefunction has the following significance: if the system is initially in a state with quantum numbers n1, ..., nN, and a position measurement is performed, the probability of finding particles in infinitesimal volumes near x1, x2, ..., xN is

The factor of N! comes from our normalizing constant, which has been chosen so that, by analogy with single-particle wavefunctions,

Because each integral runs over all possible values of x, each multi-particle state appears N! times in the integral. In other words, the probability associated with each event is evenly distributed across N! equivalent points in the integral space. Because it is usually more convenient to work with unrestricted integrals than restricted ones, the normalizing constant has been chosen to reflect this.

Finally, antisymmetric wavefunction can be written as the determinant of a matrix, known as a Slater determinant:

The operator approach and parastatistics 

The Hilbert space for  particles is given by the tensor product . The permutation group of  acts on this space by permuting the entries. By definition the expectation values for an observable  of  indistinguishable particles should be invariant under these permutation. This means that for all  and 

or equivalently for each 
.
Two states are equivalent whenever their expectation values coincide for all observables. If we restrict to observables of   identical particles, and hence observables satisfying the equation above, we find that the following states (after normalization) are equivalent
.
The equivalence classes are in bijective relation with irreducible subspaces of  under .

Two obvious irreducible subspaces are the one dimensional symmetric/bosonic subspace and anti-symmetric/fermionic subspace. There are however more types of irreducible subspaces. States associated with these other irreducible subspaces are called parastatistic states.  Young tableaux provide a way to classify all of these irreducible subspaces.

Statistical properties

Statistical effects of indistinguishability 

The indistinguishability of particles has a profound effect on their statistical properties. To illustrate this, consider a system of N distinguishable, non-interacting particles. Once again, let nj denote the state (i.e. quantum numbers) of particle j. If the particles have the same physical properties, the nj's run over the same range of values. Let ε(n) denote the energy of a particle in state n. As the particles do not interact, the total energy of the system is the sum of the single-particle energies. The partition function of the system is

where k is Boltzmann's constant and T is the temperature.  This expression can be factored to obtain

where

If the particles are identical, this equation is incorrect. Consider a state of the system, described by the single particle states [n1, ..., nN]. In the equation for Z, every possible permutation of the n'''s occurs once in the sum, even though each of these permutations is describing the same multi-particle state.  Thus, the number of states has been over-counted.

If the possibility of overlapping states is neglected, which is valid if the temperature is high, then the number of times each state is counted is approximately N!. The correct partition function is

Note that this "high temperature" approximation does not distinguish between fermions and bosons.

The discrepancy in the partition functions of distinguishable and indistinguishable particles was known as far back as the 19th century, before the advent of quantum mechanics. It leads to a difficulty known as the Gibbs paradox. Gibbs showed that in the equation Z = ξN, the entropy of a classical ideal gas is

where V is the volume of the gas and f is some function of T alone. The problem with this result is that S is not extensive – if N and V are doubled, S does not double accordingly. Such a system does not obey the postulates of thermodynamics.

Gibbs also showed that using Z = ξN/N! alters the result to

which is perfectly extensive. However, the reason for this correction to the partition function remained obscure until the discovery of quantum mechanics

 Statistical properties of bosons and fermions 

There are important differences between the statistical behavior of bosons and fermions, which are described by Bose–Einstein statistics and Fermi–Dirac statistics respectively. Roughly speaking, bosons have a tendency to clump into the same quantum state, which underlies phenomena such as the laser, Bose–Einstein condensation, and superfluidity. Fermions, on the other hand, are forbidden from sharing quantum states, giving rise to systems such as the Fermi gas.  This is known as the Pauli Exclusion Principle, and is responsible for much of chemistry, since the electrons in an atom (fermions) successively fill the many states within shells rather than all lying in the same lowest energy state.

The differences between the statistical behavior of fermions, bosons, and distinguishable particles can be illustrated using a system of two particles.

The composite system can evolve in time, interacting with a noisy environment. (This is discussed in the article on quantum entanglement.) After some time, the composite system will have an equal probability of occupying each of the states available to it. The particle states are then measured.

The probability of obtaining two particles in the  state is 0.25; the probability of obtaining two particles in the  state is 0.25; and the probability of obtaining one particle in the  state and the other in the  state is 0.5.

When the experiment is performed, the probability of obtaining two particles in the  state is now 0.33; the probability of obtaining two particles in the  state is 0.33; and the probability of obtaining one particle in the  state and the other in the  state is 0.33. Note that the probability of finding particles in the same state is relatively larger than in the distinguishable case. This demonstrates the tendency of bosons to "clump".

If A and B are identical fermions, there is only one state available to the composite system: the totally antisymmetric state . When the experiment is performed, one particle is always in the  state and the other is in the  state.

The results are summarized in Table 1:

 

As can be seen, even a system of two particles exhibits different statistical behaviors between distinguishable particles, bosons, and fermions. In the articles on Fermi–Dirac statistics and Bose–Einstein statistics, these principles are extended to large number of particles, with qualitatively similar results.

The homotopy class

To understand why particle statistics work the way that they do, note first that particles are point-localized excitations and that particles that are spacelike separated do not interact. If there is no overlap between the particles, so that they do not interact directly, then their locations must belong to the space  the subspace with coincident points removed. If  is  where , then this homotopy class only has one element. In particular, a counterclockwise interchange by half a turn is not homotopic to a clockwise interchange by half a turn.

Suppose first that . So, the only permissible interchange is to swap both particles. This interchange is an involution, so its only effect is to multiply the phase by a square root of 1. If the root is +1, then the points have Bose statistics, and if the root is –1, the points have Fermi statistics.

This is described by the infinite cyclic group generated by making a counterclockwise half-turn interchange. This is called anyonic statistics. This phase factor here is called the mutual statistics.

Finally, in the case  the space  is not connected, so even if particle I and particle II are identical, they can still be distinguished via labels such as "the particle on the left" and "the particle on the right". There is no interchange symmetry here.

See also 
 Quasi-set theory
 DeBroglie hypothesis

Footnotes

References

External links
 The Feynman Lectures on Physics Vol. III Ch. 4: Identical Particles
 Exchange of Identical and Possibly Indistinguishable Particles by John S. Denker
 Identity and Individuality in Quantum Theory (Stanford Encyclopedia of Philosophy)
 Many-Electron States in E.  Pavarini, E. Koch, and U. Schollwöck: Emergent Phenomena in Correlated Matter, Jülich 2013, 

Particle statistics
Pauli exclusion principle
Probabilistic arguments